Plesiocystiscus gutta is a species of minute sea snail, a marine gastropod in the family Cystiscidae.

Distribution
This species is endemic to São Tomé and Príncipe.

References

 Gofas S. & Fernandes F. 1988. The marginellids of São Tomé, West Africa. Journal of Conchology 33(1): 1-30, pls. 1-2.

External links
 Coovert, G. A.; Coovert, H. K. (1995). Revision of the supraspecific classification of marginelliform gastropods. The Nautilus. 109(2-3): 43-100

Cystiscidae
Endemic fauna of São Tomé and Príncipe
Invertebrates of São Tomé and Príncipe
Gastropods described in 1988
Taxonomy articles created by Polbot
Taxobox binomials not recognized by IUCN